Hot Mess is a 2009 album by Cobra Starship.

Hot Mess may also refer to:

Music
 Hot Mess (EP), an EP by Dodie
 "Hot Mess" (Cobra Starship song) (2009)
 "Hot Mess" (Ashley Tisdale song) (2009)
 "Hot Mess" (Tyler Farr song) (2012)
 "Hot Mess", a 2008 song by Sam Sparro from Sam Sparro
 "Hot Mess", a 2009 song by Uncle Kracker from Happy Hour
 "Hot Mess", a 2010 song by Chromeo from Business Casual
 "Hot Mess", a song by Girli

Film
 Hot Mess, a 2010 film written by and starring Kat Mills and Meaghan Oppenheimer